Syrén is a Swedish surname.

Håkan Syrén (born 1952) Supreme Commander of the Swedish Armed Forces from 1 January 2004 to 25 March 2009; he was the first Supreme Commander to come from the Navy.
Mikael Syrén (born 1965), writer and director.
Johan Arvid Gunnar Syrén (1903–1985), Swedish missionary.

Swedish-language surnames